Super Bowl XX was an American football game between the National Football Conference (NFC) champion Chicago Bears and the American Football Conference (AFC) champion New England Patriots to decide the National Football League (NFL) champion for the 1985 season. The Bears defeated the Patriots by the score of 46–10, capturing their first NFL championship since 1963, three years prior to the birth of the Super Bowl. Super Bowl XX was played on January 26, 1986 at the Louisiana Superdome in New Orleans.

This was the fourth Super Bowl and, to date, the last time in which both teams made their Super Bowl debuts. Presently, this can only occur again if the Detroit Lions play the Cleveland Browns, Jacksonville Jaguars or Houston Texans. The Bears entered the game after becoming the second team in NFL history to win 15 regular season games. With their then-revolutionary 46 defense, Chicago led the league in several defensive categories, outscored their opponents with a staggering margin of 456–198, and recorded two postseason shutouts. The Patriots were considered a Cinderella team during the 1985 season, and posted an 11–5 regular season record, but entered the playoffs as a wild card because of tiebreakers. But defying the odds, New England posted three road playoff wins to advance to Super Bowl XX.

In their victory over the Patriots, the Bears set or tied Super Bowl records for sacks (seven), fewest rushing yards allowed (seven), and margin of victory (36 points). At the time, New England broke the record for the quickest lead in Super Bowl history, with Tony Franklin's 36-yard field goal 1:19 into the first quarter after a Chicago fumble. But the Patriots were eventually held to negative yardage (−19) throughout the entire first half, and finished with just 123 total yards from scrimmage, the second lowest total yards in Super Bowl history, behind the Minnesota Vikings (119 total yards) in Super Bowl IX. Bears defensive end Richard Dent, who had 1.5 quarterback sacks, forced two fumbles, and blocked a pass, was named the game's Most Valuable Player (MVP). Although he posted relatively mediocre game statistics and failed to score a touchdown himself, star running back Walter Payton was also later credited as being a major factor in the Bears' victory on account of the Patriots' heavy coverage of him giving other members of the team more and better opportunities to score.

The telecast of the game on NBC was watched by an estimated 92.57 million viewers. To commemorate the 20th Super Bowl, all previous Super Bowl MVPs were honored during the pregame ceremonies.

Background

NFL owners voted to award Super Bowl XX to New Orleans on December 14, 1982, at the owners' mid-season meeting held in Dallas. This would be the sixth time that New Orleans hosted the Super Bowl. Tulane Stadium was the site of IV, VI, and IX; while the Louisiana Superdome previously hosted XII and XV. Hosts for both XIX and XX would be selected, and potentially XXI as well. A total of ten cities put in bids: Palo Alto (Stanford Stadium), New Orleans (Superdome), Miami (Orange Bowl), Houston (Rice Stadium), Seattle (Kingdome), Detroit (Silverdome), Pasadena (Rose Bowl), Tampa (Tampa Stadium), Anaheim (Anaheim Stadium), and Jacksonville (Gator Bowl). As part of their pitch, the representatives from New Orleans stressed that if they were not selected for XX, due to scheduling conflicts, they would not be able to host the Super Bowl again until 1990. Stanford Stadium was picked for XIX, and Rice Stadium was speculated for XXI, but ultimately no decision was made for that game. Yet again, Miami was rejected, due to the aging condition of the Orange Bowl. A proposed sales tax levy to pay for a new stadium had failed at the ballot box on November 2, further sinking any chances for South Florida.

As of 2022, Super Bowl XX remains the last Super Bowl to feature two teams both making their first appearance in the game. It was the fourth overall following Super Bowl I, Super Bowl III, and Super Bowl XVI. Absent further expansion of the NFL, any future Super Bowl that would have such a combination would have to have the Detroit Lions playing either the Cleveland Browns, Houston Texans, or Jacksonville Jaguars in the game.  All 16 NFC teams have played in an NFL championship game (Detroit last made an NFL championship game in the pre-merger era);  only the three AFC franchises that began play since 1995 (the technicalities of the Browns franchise relocating means this version began in 1999) have yet to reach a league championship game.

The nation's recognition of the Bears' accomplishment was overshadowed by the explosion of the Space Shuttle Challenger's STS 51-L mission two days later, an event which caused the cancellation of the Bears' post-Super Bowl White House visit.  Jim McMahon drew controversy after Super Bowl XXXI by wearing a Bears jersey to the Green Bay Packers' visit following their championship, owing to his first official visit never having happened at the time. Twenty-five years after the championship, the surviving members of the team would be invited to the White House in 2011 by President Barack Obama, a Chicago native and Bears fan.

Chicago Bears

Under head coach Mike Ditka, who won the 1985 NFL Coach of the Year Award, the Bears went 15–1 in the regular season, becoming the second NFL team to win 15 regular season games, while outscoring their opponents with a staggering margin of 456–198.

The Bears' defense, the "46 defense", allowed the fewest points (198), fewest total yards (4,135), and fewest rushing of any team during the regular season (1,319).  They also led the league in interceptions (34) and ranked third in sacks (64).

Pro Bowl quarterback Jim McMahon provided the team with a solid passing attack, throwing for 2,392 yards and 15 touchdowns, while also rushing for 252 yards and three touchdowns. Running back Walter Payton, who was then the NFL's all-time leading rusher with 14,860 yards, rushed for 1,551 yards. He also caught 49 passes for 500 yards, and scored 11 touchdowns. Linebacker Mike Singletary won the NFL Defensive Player of the Year Award by recording three sacks, three fumble recoveries, and one interception.

One of the most distinguishable players on defense was rookie lineman William "The Refrigerator" Perry, who came into training camp before the season weighing over 380 pounds. However, after Bears defensive coordinator Buddy Ryan told the press that the team "wasted" their first round draft pick on him, Perry lost some weight and ended up being an effective defensive tackle, finishing the season with five sacks. He got even more attention when Ditka started putting him in the game at the fullback position during offensive plays near the opponent's goal line. During the regular season, Perry rushed for two touchdowns, caught a pass for another touchdown, and was frequently a lead blocker for Payton during goal line plays.

The Bears' "46 defense" also had the following impact players: on the defensive line, Pro Bowler and future Hall of Famer Richard Dent led the NFL in sacks (17), while Pro Bowler and future Hall of Famer Dan Hampton recorded 6.5 sacks, and nose tackle Steve McMichael compiled eight. In addition to Singletary, linebacker Otis Wilson had 10.5 sacks and three interceptions, while Wilber Marshall recorded four interceptions. In the secondary, defensive back Leslie Frazier had six interceptions, Mike Richardson recorded four interceptions, Dave Duerson had five interceptions, and Gary Fencik recorded five interceptions and 118 tackles.

Chicago's main offensive weapon was Payton and the running game. A big reason for Payton's success was fullback Matt Suhey as the primary lead blocker. Suhey was also a good ball carrier, rushing for 471 yards and catching 33 passes for 295 yards. The team's rushing was also aided by Pro Bowlers Jim Covert and Jay Hilgenberg and the rest of the Bears' offensive line including Mark Bortz, Keith Van Horne, and Tom Thayer.

In their passing game, the Bears' primary deep threat was wide receiver Willie Gault, who caught 33 passes for 704 yards, an average of 21.3 yards per catch, and returned 22 kickoffs for 557 yards and a touchdown. Tight end Emery Moorehead was another key contributor, catching 35 passes for 481 yards. Wide receiver Dennis McKinnon was another passing weapon, recording 31 receptions, 555 yards, and seven touchdowns.  On special teams, Kevin Butler set a rookie scoring record with 144 points, making 31 of 37 field goals (83%) and 51 of 51 extra points.

Meanwhile, the players brought their characterizations to the national stage with "The Super Bowl Shuffle", a rap song the Bears recorded for which they filmed a music video during the 1985 season. Although it was in essence a novelty song, it peaked at number 41 on the Billboard charts and even received a Grammy Award nomination for Best R&B Performance by a Duo or Group with Vocals in 1987.

New England Patriots

The Patriots were a Cinderella team during the 1985 season because many sports writers and fans thought they were lucky to make the playoffs at all. New England began the season losing three of their first five games, but won six consecutive games to finish with an 11–5 record. However, the 11–5 mark only earned them third place in the AFC East behind the Miami Dolphins and the New York Jets.

Quarterback Tony Eason, in his third year in the NFL, was inconsistent during the regular season, completing 168 out of 299 passes for 2,156 yards and 11 touchdowns, but also 17 interceptions.   His backup, Steve Grogan, was considered one of the best reserve quarterbacks in the league. Grogan was the starter in six of the Patriots' games, and finished the regular season with 85 out of 156 completions for 1,311 yards, 7 touchdowns, and 5 interceptions.

Wide receiver Stanley Morgan provided the team with a good deep threat, catching 39 passes for 760 yards and 5 touchdowns. On the other side of the field, multi-talented wide receiver Irving Fryar was equally effective, catching 39 passes for 670 yards, while also rushing for 27 yards, gaining another 559 yards returning punts and kickoffs, and scoring 10 touchdowns. But like the Bears, the Patriots' main strength on offense was their rushing attack. Halfback Craig James rushed for 1,227 yards, caught 27 passes for 370 yards, and scored 7 touchdowns. Fullback Tony Collins rushed for 657 yards, recorded a team-leading 52 receptions for 549 yards, and scored 5 touchdowns. The Patriots also had an outstanding offensive line, led by Pro Bowl tackle Brian Holloway and future Hall of Fame guard John Hannah.

New England's defense ranked 5th in the league in fewest yards allowed (5,048). Pro Bowl linebacker Andre Tippett led the AFC with 16.5 sacks and recovered 3 fumbles. Pro Bowl linebacker Steve Nelson was also a big defensive weapon, excelling at pass coverage and run stopping. Also, the Patriots' secondary only gave up 14 touchdown passes during the season, second fewest in the league. Pro Bowl defensive back Raymond Clayborn recorded 6 interceptions for 80 return yards and 1 touchdown, while Pro Bowler Fred Marion had 7 interceptions for 189 return yards.

Playoffs

In the playoffs, the Patriots qualified as the AFC's second wild card.

But the Patriots, under head coach Raymond Berry, defied the odds, beating the New York Jets 26–14, Los Angeles Raiders 27–20, and the Dolphins 31–14 – all on the road – to make it to the Super Bowl. The win against Miami had been especially surprising, not only because Miami was the only team to beat Chicago in the season, but also because New England had not won in the Orange Bowl (Miami's then-home field) since 1966, the Dolphins' first season (then in the AFL). The Patriots had lost to Miami there 18 consecutive times, including a 30–27 loss in their 15th game of the season. But New England dominated the Dolphins in the AFC Championship Game, recording two interceptions from quarterback Dan Marino and recovering 4 fumbles. New England remains the only team to finish third in their division and qualify for the Super Bowl in the same season.

Meanwhile, the Bears became the first and only team in NFL history to shut out both of their opponents in the playoffs, beating the New York Giants 21–0 and the Los Angeles Rams 24–0.

Super Bowl pregame hype
Much of the Super Bowl pregame hype centered on Bears quarterback Jim McMahon. First, he was fined by the NFL during the playoffs for a violation of the league's dress code, wearing a head band from Adidas. He then started to wear a head band where he hand-wrote "Rozelle", after then-league commissioner Pete Rozelle.

McMahon suffered a strained glute as the result of a hit taken in the NFC Championship Game and flew his acupuncturist into New Orleans to get treatment. During practice four days before the Super Bowl, he wore a headband reading "Acupuncture". During a Bears practice before the Super Bowl, McMahon mooned a helicopter that was hovering over the practice.

Another anecdote involving McMahon during the Super Bowl anticipation involved WDSU sports anchor Buddy Diliberto reporting a quote attributed to McMahon, where he had allegedly referred to the women of New Orleans as "sluts" on a local morning sports talk show. This caused wide controversy among the women of New Orleans and McMahon began receiving calls from irate fans in his hotel. A groggy McMahon, who had not been able to sleep well because of all the calls he had gotten, was confronted by Mike Ditka later that morning and denied making the statement, saying he would not have even been awake to make the comment when he was said to have done so. He was supported in his claim by WLS reporter Les Grobstein, who was present when the alleged statements were made. WDSU would later retract the statement, have an on-air apology read by the station's general manager during the noon newscast on January 23, and suspended Diliberto.

As the designated home team in the annual rotation between AFC and NFC teams, the Patriots wore their red jerseys with white pants, even though they wore white jerseys with red pants for all home games during the regular season. New England made the switch for the Super Bowl after winning vs. the Jets and Dolphins wearing red jerseys. The Bears donned their road white uniforms with navy pants.

Broadcasting
The NBC telecast of the game, with play-by-play announcer Dick Enberg and color commentators Merlin Olsen and Bob Griese (who was not in the booth with Enberg and Olsen), garnered the third highest Nielsen rating of any Super Bowl to date at 48.3, but it ended up being the first Super Bowl to garner over 90 million viewers, the highest ever at that time. While Dick Enberg, Merlin Olsen and Bob Griese called the game, Bob Costas and his NFL '85 castmates, Ahmad Rashad and Pete Axthelm anchored the pregame, halftime and postgame coverage. Other contributors included Charlie Jones (recapping Super Bowl I), Larry King (interviewing Mike Ditka and Raymond Berry), and Bill Macatee (profiling Patriots owner Billy Sullivan and his family). The pregame coverage also included a skit featuring comedian Rodney Dangerfield, an interview by NBC Nightly News anchor Tom Brokaw of United States President Ronald Reagan at the White House (this would not become a regular Super Bowl pregame feature until Super Bowl XLIII, when Today show host Matt Lauer interviewed U.S. President Barack Obama) and a concept devised by then-NBC Sports executive Michael Weisman which became known as the "Silent Minute," a one-minute countdown featuring a black screen with a digital clock which morphed into Roman numerals when it reached twenty seconds remaining and accompanied by Leroy Anderson's "The Syncopated Clock."

The Last Precinct debuted on NBC after the game.

Super Bowl XX was simulcast in Canada on CTV and also broadcast on Channel 4 in the United Kingdom, and Canal 5 in Mexico, with play-by-play announcers Toño de Valdés, Enrique Burak and color commentator Pepe Segarra.

Super Bowl XX is featured on NFL's Greatest Games under the title Super Bears with narration by Don LaFontaine.

The national radio broadcast was aired by NBC Radio, which outbid CBS Radio for the nationwide NFL contract in March 1985. Don Criqui was the play-by-play announcer, with Bob Trumpy as the color analyst. WGN-AM carried the game in the Chicago area (and thanks to WGN's 50,000-watt clear-channel signal, to much of the continental United States), with Wayne Larrivee on play-by-play, and Jim Hart and Dick Butkus providing commentary. WEEI carried the game in the Boston area, with John Carlson and Jon Morris on the call.

Entertainment

This was the first year that the NFL itself implemented the pregame entertainment.  The pregame entertainment show began after the players left the field and ended with kick-off.  Lesslee Fitzmorris created and directed the show.  To celebrate the 20th Super Bowl game, the Most Valuable Players of the previous Super Bowls were featured during the pregame festivities.  The number one song of the year coupled with video plays from each Super Bowl accompanied the presentation of each player.  Performers formed the score of each championship game.   The show concluded with the question of who would be the next Super Bowl Champions. This would start a tradition occurring every ten years (in Super Bowls XXX, XL and 50) in which past Super Bowl MVPs would be honored before the game.

After trumpeter Wynton Marsalis performed the national anthem, Bart Starr, MVP of Super Bowl I and Super Bowl II, tossed the coin.

The performance event group Up with People performed during the halftime show titled "Beat of the Future". Up with People dancers portrayed various scenes into the future. This was the last Super Bowl to feature Up with People as a halftime show, though they later performed in the Super Bowl XXV pregame show. The halftime show was dedicated to the memory of Dr. Martin Luther King Jr. (the first observance of Martin Luther King Jr. Day had been held the previous Monday).

Game summary

First quarter
The Patriots took the then-quickest lead in Super Bowl history after linebacker Larry McGrew recovered a fumble from Walter Payton at the Chicago 19-yard line on the second play of the game (the Bears themselves would break this record in Super Bowl XLI when Devin Hester ran back the opening kickoff for a touchdown). Bears quarterback Jim McMahon took responsibility for this fumble after the game, saying he had called the wrong play. This set up Tony Franklin's 36-yard field goal 1:19 into the first quarter after three incomplete passes by Tony Eason (during the first of those three, starting tight end Lin Dawson went down with torn ligaments in his knee). "I looked up at the message board", said Chicago linebacker Mike Singletary, "and it said that 15 of the 19 teams that scored first won the game. I thought, yeah, but none of those 15 had ever played the Bears." Chicago struck back with a 7-play, 59-yard drive, featuring a 43-yard pass completion from McMahon to wide receiver Willie Gault, to set up a field goal from Kevin Butler, tying the score at 3–3.

After both teams traded punts, Richard Dent and linebacker Wilber Marshall shared a sack on Eason, forcing a fumble that lineman Dan Hampton recovered on the Patriots 13-yard line. Chicago then drove to the 3-yard line, but had to settle for another field goal from Butler after rookie defensive lineman William "The Refrigerator" Perry was tackled (and technically sacked) for a 1-yard loss while trying to throw his first NFL pass on a halfback option play. On the Patriots' ensuing drive, Dent forced running back Craig James to fumble, which was recovered by Singletary at the 13-yard line. Two plays later, Bears fullback Matt Suhey scored on an 11-yard touchdown run to increase the lead to 13–3.

New England took the ensuing kickoff and ran one play before the first quarter ended, which resulted in positive yardage for the first time in the game (a 3-yard run by James).

Second quarter
After an incomplete pass and a 4-yard loss, the Patriots had to send in punter Rich Camarillo again, and receiver Keith Ortego returned the ball 12 yards to the 41-yard line. The Bears subsequently drove 59 yards in 10 plays, featuring a 24-yard reception by Suhey, to score on McMahon's 2-yard touchdown run to increase their lead, 20–3. After the ensuing kickoff, New England lost 13 yards in 3 plays and had to punt again, but got the ball back with great field position when defensive back Raymond Clayborn recovered a fumble from Suhey at their own 46-yard line. On the punt, Ortego forgot what the play call was for the punt return, and the ensuing chaos resulted in him being penalized for running after a fair catch and teammate Leslie Frazier suffering a knee injury, which ended his career.

Patriots head coach Raymond Berry then replaced Eason with Steve Grogan, who had spent the previous week hoping he would have the opportunity to step onto the NFL's biggest stage. "I probably won't get a chance", he had told reporters a few days before the game. "I just hope I can figure out some way to get on the field. I could come in on the punt-block team and stand behind the line and wave my arms, or something." But on his first drive, Grogan could only lead them to the 37-yard line, and they decided to punt rather than risk a 55-yard field goal attempt. The Bears then marched 72 yards in 11 plays, moving the ball inside the Patriots' 10-yard line. New England kept them out of the end zone, but Butler kicked his third field goal on the last play of the half to give Chicago a 23–3 halftime lead.

The end of the first half was controversial. With 21 seconds left, McMahon scrambled to the Patriots' 3-yard line and was stopped inbounds. With the clock ticking down, players from both teams were fighting, and the Bears were forced to snap the ball before the officials formally put it back into play, allowing McMahon to throw the ball out of bounds and stop the clock with three seconds left. The Bears were penalized five yards for delay of game, but according to NFL rules, 10 seconds should have also been run off the clock during such a deliberate clock-stopping attempt in the final two minutes of a half.  In addition, a flag should have been thrown for fighting (also according to NFL rules). This would have likely resulted in offsetting penalties, which would still allow for a field goal attempt.  Meanwhile, the non-call on the illegal snap was promptly acknowledged by the officials and reported by NBC sportscasters during halftime, but the resulting three points were not taken away from the Bears (because of this instance, the NFL instructed officials to strictly enforce the 10-second run-off rule at the start of the 1986 season).

The Bears had dominated New England in the first half, holding them to 21 offensive plays (only four of which resulted in positive yardage), −19 total offensive yards, two pass completions, one first down, and 3 points. While Eason was in the game, the totals were six possessions, one play of positive yardage out of 15 plays, no first downs, 3 points, 3 punts, 2 turnovers, no pass completions, and -36 yards of total offense.  Meanwhile, Chicago gained 236 yards and scored 23 points themselves.

Third quarter
After the Patriots received the second-half kickoff, they managed to get one first down, but then had to punt after Grogan was sacked twice. Camarillo, who punted four times in the first half, managed to pin the Bears back at their own 4-yard line with a then-Super Bowl record 62-yard punt. But the Patriots' defense still had no ability to stop Chicago's offense. On their very first play, McMahon faked a handoff to Payton, then threw a 60-yard completion to Gault. Eight plays later, McMahon finished the Super Bowl-record 96-yard drive with a 1-yard touchdown run to increase the Bears' lead to 30–3. On New England's second drive of the quarter, Chicago cornerback Reggie Phillips (who replaced Frazier) intercepted a pass from Grogan and returned it 28 yards for a touchdown to increase the lead to 37–3.

On the second play of their ensuing possession, the Patriots turned the ball over again, when receiver Cedric Jones lost a fumble after catching a 19-yard pass from Grogan, and Wilber Marshall returned the fumble 13 yards to New England's 37-yard line. A few plays later, McMahon's 27-yard completion to receiver Dennis Gentry moved the ball to the 1-yard line, setting up perhaps the most memorable moment of the game. William "The Refrigerator" Perry was brought on to score on offense, as he had done twice in the regular season. His touchdown (while running over Patriots linebacker Larry McGrew in the process) made the score 44–3. The Bears' 21 points in the third quarter is still a record for the most points scored in that period, and their 41-point lead remains the record for widest margin after three quarters in a Super Bowl.

Perry's surprise touchdown cost Las Vegas sports books hundreds of thousands of dollars in losses from prop bets.

Fourth quarter
The Patriots finally scored a touchdown early in the fourth quarter, advancing the ball 76 yards in 12 plays and scoring on an 8-yard fourth-down pass from Grogan to receiver Irving Fryar. But the Bears' defense dominated New England for the rest of the game, forcing another fumble, another interception, and defensive lineman Henry Waechter's sack on Grogan in the end zone for a safety to make the final score 46–10.

One oddity in the Bears' victory was that Walter Payton had a relatively poor performance running the ball and never scored a touchdown in Super Bowl XX, his only Super Bowl appearance during his Hall of Fame career. Many people including Mike Ditka have claimed that the reason for this was due to the fact that the Patriots' defensive scheme was centered on stopping Payton. Although Payton was ultimately the Bears' leading rusher during the game, the Patriots' defense held him to only 61 yards on 22 carries, with his longest run being only 7 yards. He was given several opportunities to score near the goal line, but New England stopped him every time before he reached the end zone (such as his 2-yard loss from the New England 3-yard line a few plays before Butler's second field goal, and his 2-yard run from the 4-yard line right before McMahon's first rushing touchdown). Thus, Chicago head coach Mike Ditka opted to go for other plays to counter the Patriots' defense. Ditka has since stated that his biggest regret of his career was not creating a scoring opportunity for Payton during the game.

McMahon, who completed 12 out of 20 passes for 256 yards, became the first quarterback in a Super Bowl to score 2 rushing touchdowns. Bears receiver Willie Gault finished the game with 129 receiving yards on just 4 receptions, an average of 32.3 yards per catch. He also returned 4 kickoffs for 49 yards. Suhey had 11 carries for 52 yards and a touchdown, and caught a pass for 24 yards. Singletary tied a Super Bowl record with 2 fumble recoveries.

Eason became the first Super Bowl starting quarterback to fail to complete a pass, going 0 for 6 attempts. Grogan completed 17 out of 30 passes for 177 yards and 1 touchdown, with 2 interceptions. Although fullback Tony Collins was the Patriots' leading rusher, he was limited to just 4 yards on 3 carries, and caught 2 passes for 19 yards. New England receiver Stephen Starring returned 7 kickoffs for 153 yards and caught 2 passes for 39 yards. The Patriots, as a team, only recorded 123 total offensive yards, the second-lowest total in Super Bowl history.

Box score

Final statistics
Sources: NFL.com Super Bowl XX, USA Today Super Bowl XX Play by Play, Super Bowl XX Play Finder Chi, Super Bowl XX Play Finder NE

Statistical comparison

Individual statistics

1Completions/attempts
2Carries
3Long gain
4Receptions
5Times targeted

Records set
The following records were set in Super Bowl XX, according to the official NFL.com boxscore and the Pro-Football-Reference.com game summary.

Starting lineups
Source:

Officials
 Referee: Red Cashion #43 first Super Bowl
 Umpire: Ron Botchan #110 first Super Bowl
 Head Linesman: Dale Williams #8 first Super Bowl
 Line Judge: Alabama Glass #15 first Super Bowl
 Back Judge: Al Jury #106 first Super Bowl
 Side Judge: Bob Rice #80 second Super Bowl (XVI)
 Field Judge: Jack Vaughan #93 first Super Bowl

References

External links
 
 NFL.com Recap 
 Super Bowl official website
 
 
 
 https://www.pro-football-reference.com – Large online database of NFL data and statistics
 Super Bowl play-by-plays from USA Today (Last accessed September 28, 2005)
 All-Time Super Bowl Odds from The Sports Network (Last accessed October 16, 2005)

Chicago Bears postseason
New England Patriots postseason
Super Bowl 020
1985 National Football League season
1986 in American football
American football competitions in New Orleans
1980s in New Orleans
1986 in sports in Louisiana
January 1986 sports events in the United States